Coenonympha tullia, the large heath or common ringlet, is a butterfly in the family Nymphalidae. It flies in a variety of grassy habitats, including roadsides, woodland edges and clearings, prairies, bogs, and arctic and alpine taiga and tundra. It is a poor flyer, but can sometimes be found along ditches seeking new grounds. It is a holarctic species found in northern Europe and Asia and across North America. The species was first described by Otto Friedrich Müller in 1764.

Subspecies

In alphabetical order:
 C. t. ampelos  (W. H. Edwards, 1871) – northwest common ringlet
 C. t. benjamini (McDunnough, 1928) – prairie ringlet
 C. t. brenda
 C. t. bosniae (Davenport, 1941)
 C. t. california (Westwood, 1851) – California ringlet
 C. t. columbiana (McDunnough, 1928) – ringlet
 C. t. davus (Fabricius, 1777)
 C. t. elko (W. H. Edwards, 1881)
 C. t. elwesi (Davenport, 1941)
 C. t. eryngii (H. Edwards, 1877)
 C. t. eunomia (Dornfeld, 1967)
 C. t. furcae (Barnes & Benjamin, 1926)
 C. t. gliwa
 C. t. haydenii (W. H. Edwards, 1872) – Hayden's common ringlet
 C. t. inornata (W. H. Edwards, 1861) – inornate common ringlet
 C. t. insulanus (McDunnough, 1928) – Vancouver ringlet
 C. t. kodiak (W. H. Edwards 1869) – Kodiak ringlet
 C. t. mackenziei (D. Davenport, 1936) – Mackenzie's ringlet
 C. t. mcisaaci (dos Passos, 1935) – McIsaac's ringlet
 C. t. mixturata (Alphéraky, 1897)
 C. t. mono (Burdick, 1942) – (common) ringlet
 C. t. ochracea (W. H. Edwards, 1861) – ochre (common) ringlet
 C. t. polydama (Haworth, 1803)
 C. t. pseudobrenda (Austin & R. Gray, 1998)
 C. t. scotica (Staudinger, 1901)
 C. t. sibirica (Davenport, 1941)
 C. t. subfusca (Barnes & Benjamin, 1926)
 C. t. suecica (Hemming, 1936)
 C. t. tullia (Müller, 1764) – common ringlet
 C. t. viluiensis (Ménétriés, 1859)
 C. t. yontocket (Porter & Mattoon, 1989) – Yontocket satyr ringlet
 C. t. yukonensis (W. Holland, 1900) – Yukon common ringlet

Formerly a subspecies:
 Coenonympha nipisiquit (McDunnough, 1939) – maritime ringlet

For more information on subspecies and biology

References 

Emmet, A.M., J. Heath et al. (Ed.), 1990. The Butterflies of Great Britain and Ireland. The Moths and Butterflies of Great Britain and Ireland Vol. 7 Part 1 (Hesperiidae to Nymphalidae). Harley Books, Colchester, UK. 370p.
Tomlinson, D. & R. Still, 2002. Britain's Butterflies. WildGuides, Old Basing, UK. 192p.

External links

Coenonympha tullia, ARKive - images and video

Coenonympha
Butterflies of Europe
Butterflies of North America
Insects of the Arctic
Butterflies described in 1764
Taxa named by Otto Friedrich Müller